Maloye Shimonovo is a rural locality (a village) in Karinskoye Rural Settlement, Alexandrovsky District, Vladimir Oblast, Russia. The population was 2 as of 2010. There is 1 street.

Geography 
Maloye Shimonovo is located on the Maly Kirzhach River, 15 km southeast of Alexandrov (the district's administrative centre) by road. Bolshoye Shimonovo is the nearest rural locality.

References 

Rural localities in Alexandrovsky District, Vladimir Oblast